Nusch Éluard (born Maria Benz; 21 June 1906 – 28 November 1946) was a French performer, model and surrealist artist.

Born Maria Benz in Mulhouse (then part of the German Empire), she met Swiss architect and artist Max Bill in the Odeon Café in Zürich; he nicknamed her "Nusch", a name she would stick to. Their liaison ended after six months when Max Bill's plan to marry her in order to avoid her pending extradition from Switzerland was vetoed by his father (to whom he owed a substantial amount of money due to medical expenses following an accident which had forced him to leave the Bauhaus).

Paris

Nusch arrived in France as a stage performer, variously described as a small-time actress, a traveling acrobat, and a "hypnotist's stooge".  She met Paul Éluard in 1930 working as a model, married him in 1934, produced surrealist photomontage and other work, and is the subject of "Facile," a collection of Éluard's poetry published as a photogravure book, illustrated with Man Ray's nude photographs of her.

She was also the subject of several cubist portraits and sketches by Pablo Picasso in the late 1930s, and is said to have had an affair with him. Nusch worked for the French Resistance during the Nazi occupation of France during World War II. She died in 1946 in Paris due to a stroke.

Photographs and paintings
 Dora Maar: "Les années vous guettent" The years await you (Nusch Éluard), 1932
 Man Ray: Nusch Éluard, 1934
 Man Ray, Paul Éluard: Facile, 1935
 Man Ray: Nusch Éluard, 1936
 Man Ray: Sonia Mossé & Nusch Éluard, 1936
 Man Ray: Lee Miller & Nusch Éluard, 1930s
 Man Ray: Ady & Nusch Éluard, 1937
 Man Ray: Ady Fidelin & Nusch Éluard, 1937
 Man Ray: Adrienne Fidelin  & Nusch Éluard, 1937

 Pablo Picasso: Nusch Éluard, Charcoal & pencil on canvas, 1938

References

External links
 Nusch, portrait d'une muse du Surréalisme, ARTELITTERA,¨PARIS, mars 2010

1906 births
1946 deaths
Actors from Mulhouse
French artists' models
French surrealist artists
Women surrealist artists
Burials at Père Lachaise Cemetery